The Lamborghini LE3512 was a naturally-aspirated V12 motor racing engine, designed and developed by Lamborghini, to compete in Formula One.

Formula One

Lamborghini made the move to Formula One in  when the FIA outlawed turbocharged engines. Former Scuderia Ferrari designer / engineer Mauro Forghieri was commissioned to design and build a new, 3.5 litre V12 engine for use by the French Larrousse team in 1989. Lamborghini representatives stated at the engine's début race, the 1989 Brazilian Grand Prix in Rio de Janeiro, that they chose a lower ranked team to join Formula One (Larrousse was in its third season using Lola chassis) as it was felt at the early stage of its development the 3512 would not be able to do justice to one of the teams usually closer to the front of the grid. Also, the front running teams already had existing engine suppliers in place (McLaren with Honda, Williams with Renault, Benetton with Ford, and Ferrari who made their own V12 engines).

The Lamborghini V12 did impress many in 1989 despite its unreliability, and the engine's best result in its first year came thanks to fast but accident-prone Larrousse driver Philippe Alliot when he qualified his Lola LC89 in 5th position for the Spanish Grand Prix at Jerez, only 1.417 seconds slower than the V10 McLaren-Honda of pole winner Ayrton Senna. Alliot then backed up that performance by scoring the engine's first point in Formula One by finishing 6th in the race and setting the 4th fastest race lap in the process. Unfortunately, Alliot's teammate for the second half of 1989, former Ferrari driver Michele Alboreto, never came to grips with either the Lola or the Lamborghini. In his eight races for Larrousse he recorded four DNF's, two failures to pre-qualify, one failure to qualify, and a single 11th-place finish in Portugal.

The Lamborghini V12's best finish came when Larrousse driver Aguri Suzuki finished 3rd in the infamous 1990 Japanese Grand Prix at Suzuka. Its time in Formula One (1989-1993) would prove to be frustrating though as poor reliability became the norm for the engine, despite being used by Grand Prix winning teams such as Lotus and Ligier who could boast driving talent such as Derek Warwick (Lotus - 1990), and Thierry Boutsen (Ligier - 1991). In a 2014 interview, Warwick said of the 3512 that it was "All noise and no go".

In 1993 after four years in Formula One with only one significant result for the engine, Bob Lutz of Lamborghini's parent company Chrysler, did a hand-shake deal with McLaren boss Ron Dennis for the team to test the LE3512 to evaluate its potential as a race winner. McLaren made a modified version of their  race car, the McLaren MP4/8 dubbed the MP4/8B, to test the engine (the test car took three months to modify to fit the longer and heavier V12). Testing was completed by triple World Champion Ayrton Senna, and future dual World Champion Mika Häkkinen at both the Silverstone Circuit in England and the Estoril circuit in Portugal. According to reports, Senna even wanted to race the engine at the Japanese Grand Prix believing that while reliability might be a problem, at least he would be quicker than with the Ford powered race car (ironically Senna would win in both Japan and the last race in Australia with the existing MP4/8). Despite this however, Ron Dennis decided to go with Peugeot V10 engines in  due to a better commercial agreement that would give long term stability to the team and at the end of the 1993 season, the Lamborghini LE3512 was retired from Grand Prix racing after the company was sold by Chrysler to an Indonesian investor group led by Tommy Suharto.

The Lamborghini, which on all cars it powered carried the words "Chrysler powered by Lamborghini" (other than the McLaren MP4/8B which was all virgin white, though the test engines were badged as Chrysler), was one of only five V12 engines used in the naturally aspirated era from 1989–2013, the others being from Ferrari (1989-1995), Honda (1991-1992), Yamaha (1991-1992), and Porsche (1991). The only other 12 cylinder engines in Formula One during this time were disastrous efforts by Life Racing Engines with their W12 engine and Subaru who reintroduced the Flat 12 to the sport, both appearing in the first half of 1990.

LE3512 power output
  -  @ 11,200 rpm
  -  @ 13,000 rpm
  -  @ 13,000 rpm
  -  @ 13,800 rpm
  -  @ 13,800 rpm
 1993 -  @ 13,800 rpm (McLaren tests)

F1 statistics 1989-1993
 Races - 80 (49 starts)
 First Race - 1989 Brazilian Grand Prix at Jacarepaguá
 First Chassis - Larrousse Lola LC88C
 Last Race - 1993 Australian Grand Prix at Adelaide
 Last Chassis - Larrousse LH93
 Wins - 0
 Pole Positions - 0
 Podiums - 1 (3rd - 1990 Japanese Grand Prix at Suzuka, Aguri Suzuki, Larrousse Lola LC90)
 Points - 20
 Teams - Larrousse, Lotus (1990), Ligier, Modena Team (1991), Minardi
 Best Qualifying - 5th, Philippe Alliot, Larrouse Lola LC89, 1989 Spanish Grand Prix at Jerez
 Best Constructors' Championship - 6th, Larrousse, 1990 (11 points)
 Best Drivers' Championship - 12th, Aguri Suzuki, 1990 (6 points)

References

External links
Lamborghini.com official website

V12
Engines by model
Gasoline engines by model
V12 engines
Formula One engines